Niphadoses palleucus is a moth in the family Crambidae. It was described by Ian Francis Bell Common in 1960. It is found in north-western Australia.

Larvae have been recorded on cultivated rice.

References

Moths described in 1960
Schoenobiinae